Periaptodes is a genus of longhorn beetles of the subfamily Lamiinae, containing the following species:

 Periaptodes frater Van der Poll, 1887
 Periaptodes lictor Pascoe, 1866
 Periaptodes olivieri Thomson, 1864
 Periaptodes paratestator Breuning, 1980
 Periaptodes potemnoides Kriesche, 1936 inq.
 Periaptodes testator Pascoe, 1866

References

Lamiini